George Pollard "Gabby" Sims Jr. (born October 23, 1927) is a former American football defensive back who played for the Los Angeles Rams. He played college football at Baylor University, having previously attended Seymour High School in Seymour, Texas. He is a member of the Baylor University Athletics Hall of Fame.

After enlisting in the Army, Sims played for the Army's Fort Ord Warriors from fall 1951 until he mustered out in 1953. Released by the Rams and the Army to the Dallas Texans, he ended up in camp with the Baltimore Colts in 1953. He was cut by the Colts in September 1953 to reduce their squad to 40 men.

See also
 List of NCAA major college yearly punt and kickoff return leaders

References

1927 births
Living people
American football defensive backs
Baylor Bears football players
Los Angeles Rams players
Players of American football from Texas
People from Dickens County, Texas